is a Japanese footballer who plays for Grulla Morioka.

Club statistics
Updated to 23 February 2016.

References

External links

Profile at Football Lab

1992 births
Living people
Waseda University alumni
Association football people from Tokyo
Japanese footballers
J2 League players
J3 League players
Thespakusatsu Gunma players
Iwate Grulla Morioka players
Association football defenders